{{automatic taxobox
| name = Protorothyridids
| fossil_range = Pennsylvanian-Asselian, 
| image = Protorothyris.jpg
| image_caption = Life restoration of Protorothyris archeri
| taxon = Protorothyrididae
| authority = Price, 1937
| type_species = Protorothyris archeri
| type_species_authority = Price, 1937
| subdivision_ranks = Genera
| subdivision = *Anthracodromeus
Cephalerpeton?Paleothyris?Protorothyris}}

Protorothyrididae is an extinct family of small, lizard-like reptiles belonging to Eureptilia. Their skulls did not have fenestrae, like the more derived diapsids. Protorothyridids lived from the Late Carboniferous to Early Permian periods, in what is now North America. Many genera of primitive reptiles were thought to be protorothyridids. Brouffia, Coelostegus, Paleothyris and Hylonomus, for example, were found to be more basal eureptiles in Muller and Reisz (2006), making the family as historically defined paraphyletic, though three genera, Protorothyris, Anthracodromeus, and Cephalerpeton, were recovered as a monophyletic group. Anthracodromeus, Paleothyris, and Protorothyris we recovered as a monophyletic group in Ford and Benson (2020) (who did not sample Cephalerpeton), who recovered them as more derived than captorhinids and Hylonomus, but less so than araeoscelidians. Anthracodromeus is the earliest known reptile to display adaptations to climbing. The majority of phylogenetic studies recover protorothyridids as basal members of Eureptilia; however, Simões et al.'' (2022) recover them as stem-amniotes instead.

References 

Prehistoric reptile families
Prehistoric romeriids
Taxa named by Llewellyn Ivor Price